Paul Wesselhöft  (born August 16, 1947, in Oklahoma City) is an American soldier, poet, politician, and author who served in the Oklahoma House of Representatives from the 54th district from 2004 to 2016. He is currently serving as a Representative in the national legislature of the Citizen Potawatomi Nation.

Political Views 
Wesselhöft has described himself as a center right and fiscally conservative Republican. In 2022, he considered running for the U.S. Senate.

Paul Wesselhöft, M.A., M.Div., a fifth-generation Oklahoman, was elected as Representative of Oklahoma in the Citizen Potawatomi Nation's national legislature, District 9, on February 2, 2008, age 60. He was also elected Delegate to the 65th annual National Congress of American Indians.
Re-elected to the Citizen Potawatomi Nation national legislature. Currently he is serving in the national legislature of the Citizen Potawatomi Nation.

Personal life 
Wesselhöft is a retired U.S. Army Chaplain and ordained Southern Baptist minister. He is married to Judy Albright (March 21, 1976) and has two children, Justin and Holly.

Wesselhöft is Native American, and is an elected Representative for District 9 of the Citizen Potawatomi Nation. Wesselhöft established the Oklahoma Native American Caucus within the Oklahoma State Legislature with fellow Representatives Lisa Johnson-Billy and Shane Jett.

Publications:  Wesselhöft, who publishes under the penname, Paul Chrisstarlon Wesselhöft, was the first-place winner for fiction for "The Scar" and first place for poetry for both "Requiem" and "The Quill."  These writings are published in the Oklahoma City Community College's literary journal, Absolute in 2002 and 2003.

Author of "The Redfeather Pentalogy" (fiction), and "Eros: Penultimate Love" (thematic poetry). Websites: paulwesselhoft.com and Archway Publishing from Simon & Schuster.

In 2018 he won first place in fiction at the annual Red Sneakers/Write Well, Sell Well writers conference in Oklahoma City. His story, "Sophie," was published in Conclave, 2018, a literary journal. Winner, first place in fiction humor at annual Writer's Con 2019. "Circumstance" is published in Conclave, 2020. 3rd Place in poetry for "Requiem" at the 2019 writers contest by Oklahoma City Writers, Inc. 3rd place at the Oklahoma Federation of Writers for Short-short fiction with "Ice." He won first place in poetry for "Appalachian"in the 2020 Oklahoma City Writers Annual Writing Contest.

He is the author of numerous articles, essays, poems and short stories to include "Distorted Image" about women and pornography.  He is published in various state and local newspapers and magazines and in many news stories, articles, and interviews published in virtually every newspaper throughout Oklahoma.

Persian Gulf War: Wesselhöft was a combat veteran of Operation Desert Shield and Operation Desert Storm. He was involved in the front line ground offensive for the liberation of Kuwait (1990-1991).  He served as the 75 TH Field Artillery Brigade Chaplain and Supervisor of four battalion chaplains and numerous staff.

Wesselhöft was an Airborne U.S. Ranger Chaplain serving the 75th Infantry Battalion in Savanah, Georgia. In 1967–1968, he also served as a private and sergeant during the Vietnam War era. He was first honorably discharged in 1968 and retired honorably as a Major in 1995. He has been deployed to, or vacationed in, or lived in 52 countries and 47 states.

Election history

References

1947 births
Living people
Republican Party members of the Oklahoma House of Representatives
21st-century Native American politicians
Citizen Potawatomi Nation politicians
Citizen Potawatomi Nation state legislators in Oklahoma